Mascoutah is a city in St. Clair County, Illinois, United States, named for the Mascoutens, a tribe of the Michigan Indians. The population was 7,483 at the 2010 census. According to the US Census Bureau, the population was estimated at 7,994 in 2019.

History 
The town of Mascoutah was originally established in 1837 as Mechanicsburg.  This was disputed with the establishment of a Post Office; the inhabitants were informed that another township in Illinois was already named Mechanicsburg. The town was renamed after the Mascouten tribe, and was officially designated Mascoutah in 1839.

Mascoutah was considered a progressive town near the turn of the 20th century.  The town saw steady growth thanks to the construction of a train depot in 1870, courtesy of the Southern Railway Company. The largest Turner Hall in Southern Illinois was established in Mascoutah in 1873 which served as the center of town social life, and the town constructed its own citizen owned power plant in 1894.  The Mascoutah Herald was established in 1885 and remains in production to this day. In 1903 the Belleville And Mascoutah Electric Railway Company planned an electric rail system to Belleville that was delayed and never completed.

The train depot shut down, the Turner Hall eventually became the chamber of commerce, and the municipal power plant now houses the city's fleet and equipment maintenance department.

Geography
The Mascoutah Civic Center is located at  (38.4922, -89.7968).

Demographics

Mascoutah was the United States center of population point in 1970. As of the census of 2000, there were 5,659 people, 2,162 households, and 1,571 families residing in the city. The racial makeup of the city was 91.73% White, 4.19% African American, 0.35% Native American, 0.97% Asian, 0.05% Pacific Islander, 0.85% from other races, and 1.86% from two or more races. Hispanic or Latino of any race were 1.75% of the population.

There were 2,162 households, out of which 35.8% had children under the age of 18 living with them, 57.5% were married couples living together, 11.2% had a female householder with no husband present, and 27.3% were non-families. 23.7% of all households were made up of individuals, and 10.5% had someone living alone who was 65 years of age or older. The average household size was 2.57 and the average family size was 3.05.

In the city, the population was spread out, with 26.4% under the age of 18, 8.5% from 18 to 24, 29.4% from 25 to 44, 21.5% from 45 to 64, and 14.2% who were 65 years of age or older. The median age was 38 years. For every 100 females, there were 92.4 males. For every 100 females age 18 and over, there were 90.1 males.

The median income for a household in the city was $46,451, and the median income for a family was $55,018. Males had a median income of $37,182 versus $23,156 for females. The per capita income for the city was $21,569. About 6.3% of families and 7.8% of the population were below the poverty line, including 11.8% of those under age 18 and 7.9% of those age 65 or over.

Location

Mascoutah is located about 7 km (4 mi) south of Interstate 64 (Exit 23) on Highway 4 at Highway 177.  It is about 46 km (29 mi) east St. Louis, Missouri.  Mascoutah is accessible to St. Louis and Lambert Airport by Metrolink from its Shiloh station a few miles northwest of town. Mascoutah is home to Mid America Airport. Nearby Scott AFB is a major employer and base residents attend school in Mascoutah. Downtown St. Louis is 30 minutes away, West County St Louis is 45 minutes away, and South County St Louis is 35 minutes away.

Parks
There are three parks in town that offer a wide array of activities.  Scheve Park has two swimming pools, 6 baseball diamonds (2 with lights), a large dog park, lit sand volleyball court, lit horseshoe pits, two soccer fields, a disc golf course with 18 tee boxes shooting to 9 targets, a skate park, ten pavilions varying in size, and several playground areas.  Scheve Park also has a restored train caboose and dining car that visitors can tour.  Maple Park is equipped with outdoor basketball facilities, a ball playing area, playground equipment, and a family sized pavilion.  Prairie Park has two fishing lakes, 3 lighted colored  fountains, picnic tables with grills and a pavilion.

Education
Mascoutah Community Unit School District#19 serves the city.  There are five schools in the district:  Mascoutah Community High School, Mascoutah Middle School, Mascoutah Elementary School, Scott Air Force Base Elementary School, and Wingate Elementary School.

Holy Childhood School is the private Catholic school in Mascoutah. It offers preschool through eighth grade.

People 
 Benno Lischer

References

External links
City of Mascoutah

Cities in Illinois
Cities in St. Clair County, Illinois